National parks of Israel are declared historic sites or nature reserves, which are mostly operated and maintained by the National Nature and Parks Authority. As of 2015, Israel maintains 81 national parks and more than 400 nature reserves, many of them in the occupied West Bank, that protect 2,500 species of indigenous wild plants, 32 species of fish, 530 species of birds and 100 species of mammals.

The parks and reserves were frequently declared around the ruins of the depopulated and subsequently demolished towns and villages of the 1948 Palestinian exodus; 182 historical Palestinian built up areas are located within Israel's parks and reserves. Some parks are located at archaeological sites such as Tel Megiddo, Beit She'an, Ashkelon and Kursi. Others, such as the Alexander stream, Mount Carmel National Park or Hurshat Tal focus on nature and the preservation of local flora and fauna. Several parks and nature reserves have camping options, such as tent grounds and bungalows, open to small groups and individual campers.  Some of them are located in the Israeli-occupied territories of the Golan Heights and the West Bank.

In 2011, the most popular national parks were Yarkon National Park, Caesarea, Ein Gedi and Tel Dan.

History

From the 1920s onwards, the British Mandatory government passed laws aimed at saving the local flora and fauna. In 1924 a Hunting Act was published and in 1926 a Forest Ordinance were published. Many sites, such as the forests of Mount Carmel and Mount Meron, were declared forest reserves; certain trees were declared protected.

In 1953 the Knesset passed the Wildlife Protection Law (חוק הגנת חיות-הבר) and the Minister of Agriculture was appointed for its implementation. In 1955, the department for the improvement of the country's landscape (המחלקה לשיפור נוף הארץ) was established in the Israeli Prime Minister's Office, which was assigned the establishment of tourist infrastructure. The department established a number of well-known national parks, such as Gan HaShlosha, Caesarea, Shivta and Avdat. In 1963 the Knesset approved the "National parks and nature reserves act" (חוק הגנים הלאומיים ושמורות הטבע), whose legislation process had already began in 1956. As a result, two authorities were established: the National Parks Authority and the Nature Reserves Authority. In 1998 the two authorities were merged into one body - Israel Nature and Parks Authority.

The last observation of an Arabian leopard took place in the northern Arabah area in 2010/11.
It is possibly extinct in the country.

Parks and reserves

In Israel the distinction between national parks and nature reserves is often hard to make. National parks are in most cases centered around archaeological sites, but sometimes include protected nature habitats. The nature reserves often contain not just protected fauna and flora, but also major archaeological sites. The Hermon Stream Nature Reserve for instance covers a stretch of forested land, but also the vast remains of the ancient city of Banias/Caesarea Philippi. Sometimes an administrative separation is made, as for instance at the Judean desert oasis of Ein Gedi, home to both the Ein Gedi Antiquities National Park and Ein Gedi Nature Reserve.

National parks in Israel
This is a partial list, containing only the best known national parks.

National parks in occupied territories

Nature reserves in Israel
This is a partial list, containing only the best known nature reserves.

Nature reserves in occupied territories

See also
Tourism in Israel
Culture of Israel
Archaeology of Israel
Wildlife of Israel

References

External links
Nature and Parks Authority Official Site

 
Nature conservation in Israel